Rieden may refer to:

 in Switzerland
 Rieden, Switzerland, in the canton of St. Gallen
 Rieden, Zurich, part of Wallisellen
 in Germany:
 Rieden, Upper Palatinate, in Bavaria 
 Rieden, Swabia, in the Ostallgäu district, Bavaria 
 Rieden am Forggensee, in the Ostallgäu district, Bavaria 
 Rieden, Rhineland-Palatinate, in the Mayen-Koblenz district, Rhineland-Palatinate